Richard Lee Arndt (born March 12, 1944) is a former professional American football defensive tackle in the National Football League (NFL). He played four seasons with the Pittsburgh Steelers.

Born and raised in northern Idaho, Arndt graduated from Sandpoint High School in 1962 and played college football at Stanford and Idaho.  A future pick in the 1966 NFL Draft, he was selected in fifth round (77th overall) by the Los Angeles Rams, but stayed in college and turned pro after the 1966 season.

The Rams traded the rights to Arndt along with quarterback Ron Smith and a second round draft pick to the Green Bay Packers for running back Tom Moore.  Arndt worked out at offensive guard and tackle before switching to defensive tackle in the Packers' 1967 training camp before the Packers traded Arndt to the Pittsburgh Steelers for a fourth round draft pick prior to the start of the 1967 season.  For the Steelers, Arndt played in all 14 games in '67, three in '68 and '69 and all 14 games again in 1970.  Cut in 1971, Arndt tried out for the Washington Redskins that season and New England Patriots the following season before retiring from the NFL.

References

External links

1944 births
Living people
American football defensive linemen
Idaho Vandals football players
People from Bonners Ferry, Idaho
Pittsburgh Steelers players
Players of American football from Idaho
Stanford Cardinal football players